Sara Johansson (born 2 October 1992) is a Swedish handball player. She currently plays for Skara HF and the Sweden women's national handball team.

References

1992 births
Living people
Swedish female handball players
21st-century Swedish women